Paweł Wojciechowski may refer to:

 Paweł Wojciechowski (economist) (born 1960), Polish economist
 Paweł Wojciechowski (footballer born 1984), Polish footballer
 Paweł Wojciechowski (pole vaulter) (born 1989), Polish pole vaulter
 Paweł Wojciechowski (footballer born 1990), Polish footballer

See also 
 Wojciechowski